A vector clock is a data structure used for determining the partial ordering of events in a distributed system and detecting causality violations. Just as in Lamport timestamps, inter-process messages contain the state of the sending process's logical clock. A vector clock of a system of N processes is an array/vector of N logical clocks, one clock per process; a local "largest possible values" copy of the global clock-array is kept in each process.

Denote  as the vector clock maintained by process , the clock updates proceed as follows:

 Initially all clocks are zero.
 Each time a process experiences an internal event, it increments its own logical clock in the vector by one. For instance, upon an event at process , it updates .
 Each time a process sends a message, it increments its own logical clock in the vector by one (as in the bullet above, but not twice for the same event) and then the message piggybacks a copy of its own vector.
 Each time a process receives a message, it increments its own logical clock in the vector by one and updates each element in its vector by taking the maximum of the value in its own vector clock and the value in the vector in the received message (for every element).

History

Without using the specific name "vector clock", the concept of a vector clock was first mentioned in a 1986 paper by Rivka Ladin and Barbara Liskov where they use the term "multipart timestamp".  To quote from page 31 of the Liskov/Ladin paper:
We solve this problem by using multipart timestamps, where there is one part for each replica. Thus, if there are n replicas, a timestamp t is

t = <t1, …, tn>

where each part is a positive integer. Since there will typically be a small number of replicas (e.g., 3 to 7), using such a timestamp is practical.

The term "vector clock" was first used independently by Colin Fidge and Friedemann Mattern in 1988.

Partial ordering property

Vector clocks allow for the partial causal ordering of events. Defining the following:
  denotes the vector clock of event , and  denotes the component of that clock for process .
 
  denotes that event  happened before event . It is defined as: if , then 

Properties:

 Antisymmetry: if , then ¬

Relation with other orders:

 Let  be the real time when event  occurs. If , then 
 Let  be the Lamport timestamp of event . If , then

Other mechanisms
 In 1999, Torres-Rojas and Ahamad developed Plausible Clocks, a mechanism that takes less space than vector clocks but that, in some cases, will totally order events that are causally concurrent.

 In 2005, Agarwal and Garg created Chain Clocks, a system that tracks dependencies using vectors with size smaller than the number of processes and that adapts automatically to systems with dynamic number of processes.
 In 2008, Almeida et al. introduced Interval Tree Clocks. This mechanism generalizes Vector Clocks and allows operation in dynamic environments when the identities and number of processes in the computation is not known in advance.

 In 2019, Lum Ramabaja developed Bloom Clocks, a probabilistic data structure whose space complexity does not depend on the number of nodes in a system. If two clocks are not comparable, the bloom clock can always deduce it, i.e. false negatives are not possible. If two clocks are comparable, the bloom clock can calculate the confidence of that statement, i.e. it can compute the false positive rate between comparable pairs of clocks.

See also
Lamport timestamps
Matrix clocks
Version vector

References

External links 
 Why Logical Clocks are Easy (Compares Causal Histories, Vector Clocks and Version Vectors)
 Explanation of Vector clocks
 Timestamp-based vector clock implementation in Erlang
 Vector clock implementation in Objective-C
 Vector clock implementation in Erlang
 Why Vector Clocks are Hard
 Why Cassandra doesn’t need vector clocks

Logical clock algorithms